Raoul Degryse (6 September 1912 – 19 June 1993) was a Belgian boxer who competed in the 1936 Summer Olympics. He was born in Oudenaarde. In 1936 he was eliminated in the quarter-finals of the flyweight class after losing his fight to the upcoming silver medalist Gavino Matta.

External links
Raoul Degryse's profile at Sports Reference.com

1912 births
1993 deaths
Flyweight boxers
Olympic boxers of Belgium
Boxers at the 1936 Summer Olympics
People from Oudenaarde
Belgian male boxers
Sportspeople from East Flanders